Nobili is an Italian surname. Notable people with the surname include:

Anna Maria Nobili, Italian physicist
Brian Nobili (born 1976), American photographer
Bruno Nobili (born 1949), Italian-Venezuelan footballer and manager
Durante Nobili, 16th-century Italian painter
Elena Nobili (1833–1900), Italian painter
Gaudenzio Nobili (1912-2021), Italian centenarian
Giuseppe Nobili (1877-1908) Italian zoologist
John Nobili (1812–1856), Italian Roman Catholic priest
Laura Nobili (2006 -), Classical Composer
Leopoldo Nobili (1784–1835), Italian physicist
Nella Nobili (1926-1985), Italian poetess and writer
Riccardo Nobili (1859–1939), Italian painter, writer and antiquarian
Roberto de Nobili (1577–1656), Italian Christian missionary to Southern India
Tito Oro Nobili (1882–1967), Italian politician
Luciano Nobili, Italian politician

See also
Nobilis (disambiguation)
Nobili Law Firm

Italian-language surnames